Cristóbal Parralo Aguilera (born 21 August 1967), known simply as Cristóbal as a player, is a Spanish retired professional footballer, currently the manager of Racing de Ferrol.

He played mainly as a right back, but could also appear as a central defender.

Playing career

Club
A product of FC Barcelona's youth ranks, Cristóbal was born in Priego de Córdoba, Andalusia, and he made his professional debut in 1987–88, being regularly used as the Catalans lifted that season's Copa del Rey. Subsequently, he represented Real Oviedo and CD Logroñés, where solid displays earned him a return to the Camp Nou.

Cristóbal was scarcely played in his second stint, and returned to Oviedo: in the subsequent nine campaigns (three plus six at Barça neighbours RCD Espanyol) he rarely missed a game, and left Spain in 2001 with 454 La Liga appearances to his credit. Aged 34, he still moved to Paris Saint-Germain FC, having two respectable Ligue 1 seasons before retiring at the end of 2002–03.

International
Cristóbal earned six caps for Spain, the first in a friendly in Oviedo with Uruguay on 4 September 1991.

International goals

Coaching career
After a brief spell with former club Espanyol as director of football, Parralo joined countryman Quique Sánchez Flores at S.L. Benfica's coaching staff, for 2008–09. In early February 2009 he returned to his country and signed with lowly SCR Peña Deportiva in the Segunda División B, being one of two managers in a relegation-ending season.

Parralo signed a one-year contract with Segunda División club Girona FC in June 2009. He was sacked on 26 October, with the team ranking penultimate with just seven points in nine matches.

On 24 October 2017, after Deportivo de La Coruña first-team manager Pepe Mel was fired due to poor results, Parralo moved from the reserve side and was appointed caretaker until the following 30 June. After only three months in charge, and after conceding 14 goals in the last three matches (which included 7–1 and 5–0 away drubbings against Real Madrid and Real Sociedad, respectively), he was relieved of his duties.

On 19 June 2018, Parralo was named coach of second division side AD Alcorcón. He extended his contract in October to last until the end of the 2019–20 campaign, but was ousted a year early when Fran Fernández was named in his place.

Parralo returned to the same league on 11 November 2019, replacing Iván Ania at a Racing de Santander side that had won one of 15 matches all season. He left by mutual consent the following 4 February, having won once in 11 games for the last-placed team.

On 10 February 2021, Parralo replaced the dismissed Emilio Larraz at the helm of third-tier Racing de Ferrol.

Managerial statistics

Honours

Player
Barcelona
La Liga: 1991–92
Copa del Rey: 1987–88
European Cup: 1991–92
UEFA Cup Winners' Cup: 1988–89

Espanyol
Copa del Rey: 1999–2000

Paris Saint-Germain
UEFA Intertoto Cup: 2001
Coupe de France runner-up: 2002–03

See also
List of La Liga players (400+ appearances)

References

External links

1967 births
Living people
Sportspeople from the Province of Córdoba (Spain)
Spanish footballers
Footballers from Andalusia
Association football defenders
La Liga players
Segunda División players
CF Damm players
FC Barcelona Atlètic players
FC Barcelona players
Real Oviedo players
CD Logroñés footballers
RCD Espanyol footballers
Ligue 1 players
Paris Saint-Germain F.C. players
Spain youth international footballers
Spain under-21 international footballers
Spain international footballers
Catalonia international footballers
Spanish expatriate footballers
Expatriate footballers in France
Spanish expatriate sportspeople in France
Spanish football managers
La Liga managers
Segunda División managers
Segunda División B managers
Primera Federación managers
Girona FC managers
Deportivo de La Coruña managers
AD Alcorcón managers
Racing de Santander managers
Racing de Ferrol managers
Spanish expatriate sportspeople in Portugal
People from Subbética